Veikko Tapani Lavonen (born 1 February 1945 in Keuruu) is a Finnish former wrestler who competed in the 1972 Summer Olympics.

References

External links
 

1945 births
Living people
Olympic wrestlers of Finland
Wrestlers at the 1972 Summer Olympics
Finnish male sport wrestlers
People from Keuruu
Sportspeople from Central Finland